Nahoshi Yoshinori Lugo Ortega (born October 10, 1994, in Guadalajara, Jalisco) is a Mexican professional footballer who plays for Tecos on loan from U. de G.

External links

References

Living people
1994 births
Mexican footballers
Association football midfielders
Leones Negros UdeG footballers
Inter Playa del Carmen players
Tecos F.C. footballers
Liga MX players
Ascenso MX players
Liga Premier de México players
Tercera División de México players
Footballers from Guadalajara, Jalisco